British rock band Coldplay have received numerous awards, nominations, and honorary accolades throughout their career. They were formed in London by Chris Martin (lead vocals, piano), Jonny Buckland (guitar), Guy Berryman (bass guitar), Will Champion (drums, percussion) and Phil Harvey (creative direction). The band signed a record deal with Parlophone in 1999 and released Parachutes in the following year. It received a Brit Award for British Album of the Year, a Grammy Award for Best Alternative Music Album and a Mercury Prize nomination. Their second album, A Rush of Blood to the Head (2002), repeated the feat and spawned the singles "The Scientist" and "Clocks". The latter won a Grammy Award for Record of the Year and the former received three MTV Video Music Awards. In 2003, they were named Songwriters of the Year by the Ivor Novello Awards. 

The band then released X&Y (2005), which earned them a third Brit Award for British Album of the Year, making Coldplay the first act in history to achieve the feat both overall and with three consecutive projects. As of 2022, they remain the category's biggest winners (tied with Arctic Monkeys and Adele). With Viva la Vida or Death and All His Friends (2008), the band received a Grammy Award for Best Rock Album and their first Album of the Year nomination. The title track, "Viva la Vida", won a Grammy Award for Song of the Year and Best Pop Performance by a Duo or Group with Vocals. In 2009, they received a NRJ Award of Honour in recognition of their career accomplishments, impact and influence on the music industry. 

Coldplay were named one of the best music artists of all time by VH1 in 2010 as well, while "Yellow" was part of the Rock and Roll Hall of Fame's "Songs That Shaped Rock and Roll" exhibition during the next year. Their fifth album, Mylo Xyloto (2011), won the band's first prizes at the Billboard Music Awards, including Top Rock Album and Top Rock Artist. They also received a Brit Award for Best Live Act with the Mylo Xyloto Tour. In 2013, their single "Atlas" was released as part of The Hunger Games: Catching Fire soundtrack, receiving a Critics' Choice Awards nomination and being shortlisted for the 87th Academy Awards. 

In 2014, Fuse ranked them as the sixth most awarded group of all time, the band also released Ghost Stories, which was nominated for Best Pop Vocal Album at the 57th Grammy Awards. Their seventh album, A Head Full of Dreams, was made available in 2015. Its third single, "Up&Up", earned many accolades for its surrealistic music video, including two D&AD Awards and two silver prizes at the Cannes Lions International Festival of Creativity. The song had a Best Music Video nomination at the 59th Grammy Awards as well, losing to Beyoncé's "Formation". In 2016, Coldplay were honoured with a Godlike Genius Award from the NME Awards, which recognize "careers of music icons who have been pioneers in the industry". The year also saw them become the most awarded and nominated band of all time at the Brit Awards, surpassing Take That.

With Everyday Life (2019), they received their second Album of the Year nomination at the 63rd Grammy Awards and a GAFFA Award for International Band of the Year, while the music videos for "Orphans" and "Daddy" won a MTV Video Music Award and two Clio Awards, respectively. Coldplay then released "Higher Power" in 2021 and earned a nomination for Best Pop Duo/Group Performance at the 64th Grammy Awards. It served as the lead single of their ninth album, Music of the Spheres, which received nods for Favorite Rock Album at the American Music Awards and Top Rock Album at the Billboard Music Awards. The band was later nominated for Album of the Year and Best Pop Vocal Album at the 65th Grammy Awards, while another Best Pop Duo/Group Performance nod was secured with "My Universe". The song also broke the Guinness World Record for highest British track debut on the Billboard Hot 100 chart and earned their first wins at the Gaon Chart Music Awards, Melon Music Awards and MTV Video Music Awards Japan.

Awards and nominations

Other accolades

World records
The band have established ten world records throughout the years, with four of them being broken by other artists.

Listicles
According to listicle aggregator Acclaimed Music, Coldplay are the 10th most acclaimed act of the 2000s decade, ranking at 41st place among British acts in the all time list.

Honorary degree

Notes

References

External links
 Coldplay Official Website
 Coldplay on AllMusic

Awards
Lists of awards received by British musician
Lists of awards received by musical group